After All The Wishing... is an album by Bristol musician Jim Johnston. It was released in 2015 and features fellow Bristolian Mark Stewart from The Pop Group.

References

2015 albums